This page details the qualifying process for the 1982 African Cup of Nations in Libya. Libya, as hosts, and Nigeria, as title holders, qualified automatically.

Qualifying tournament
 qualified as holders
 qualified as hosts

Preliminary round

|}

Mozambique won 7–3 on aggregate.

Madagascar won by away goals rule after 1–1 on aggregate.

Mali won 3–2 on aggregate.

Zimbabwe won 2–1 on aggregate.

Liberia won by away goals rule after 1–1 on aggregate.

Congo won by away goals rule after 1–1 on aggregate.

Senegal won 4–1 on aggregate.

Equatorial Guinea advanced after Benin withdrew.

Rwanda advanced after Uganda withdrew.

Upper Volta advanced after Gabon withdrew.

First round

|}

Morocco won 8–1 on aggregate.

Egypt won 7–3 on aggregate.

Cameroon won 6–2 on aggregate.

Zaire won 5–4 on aggregate.

Algeria won 5–4 on aggregate.

Ghana won 2–1 on aggregate.

Zambia won 3–0 on aggregate.

Tunisia won 1–0 on aggregate.

Ethiopia won 4–3 on penalty shootout after 1–1 on aggregate.Guinea advanced after Equatorial Guinea withdrew.Madagascar advanced after Tanzania withdrew.Second round

|}Ethiopia won by away goals rule after 3–3 on aggregate.Ghana won 4–3 on aggregate.`Cameroon won 6–3 on aggregate.Zambia won 3–2 on aggregate.Algeria won 8–1 on aggregate.Tunisia advanced after Egypt withdrew.''

Qualifying Teams

References

External links
CAN 1982 details – rsssf.com

Qual
1982
Qualification